Valentine Treadwell (c. 1813 – September 1, 1888 Potter's Hollow, Albany County, New York) was an American farmer and politician from New York.

Life
He was the son of Stephen Treadwell, a Quaker minister who removed to Potter's Hollow in 1816.

He was Supervisor of the Town of Rensselaerville in 1845 an 1846.

He was a Whig/Anti-Rent member of the New York State Assembly (Albany Co.) in 1847.

He was a member of the New York State Senate (11th D.) in 1848 and 1849.

He was Postmaster of Potter's Hollow for about 25 years.

In 1883, he was nominated on the Citizen's Association ticket in Albany County for Justice of Sessions. At the time of his death, he was a Justice of the Peace.

Sources
The New York Civil List compiled by Franklin Benjamin Hough (pages 136, 146, 233 and 311; Weed, Parsons and Co., 1858)
Manual for the Use of the Legislature (1870; pg. 150, "Post-Offices and Postmasters")
THE STATE CAMPAIGN in NYT on October 11, 1883
Obit from NYT (issue of September 2, 1888) transcribed at Gen Forum

1810s births
1888 deaths
New York (state) state senators
New York (state) Whigs
19th-century American politicians
People from Albany County, New York
New York (state) postmasters
Members of the New York State Assembly
Town supervisors in New York (state)